Una giornata uggiosa (A gloomy day) is an album by the Italian singer and songwriter Lucio Battisti. It was released in January 1980 by Numero Uno.

The album was Italy's fifth best-selling album in 1980. It was also the last one to feature his collaboration with lyricist Mogol. It was recorded at the Townhouse Studios and CTS in London, and mixed at The Manor in Oxfordshire between June and December 1979.

Track listing 
All lyrics written by Mogol, all music composed by Lucio Battisti.
 "Il monolocale" (The Flat) – 4:50
 "Arrivederci a questa sera" (Goodbye To This Evening) – 4:15
 "Gelosa cara" (Jealous Darling) – 3:53
 "Orgoglio e dignità" (Pride And Dignity) – 4:28
 "Una vita viva" (An Alive Life) – 4:04
 "Amore mio di provincia" (My Love of Province) – 4:12
 "Questo amore" (This Love) – 4:18
 "Perché non sei una mela" (Why Aren't You an Apple?) – 3:29
 "Una giornata uggiosa" (A Gloomy Day) – 5:13
 "Con il nastro rosa" (With The Pink Ribbon) – 5:03

References

1980 albums
Lucio Battisti albums